Belgrade Music Festival (BEMUS) is a Serbian music festival. Founded in 1969, it is the oldest and the most prominent music festival in Serbia and one of the most distinctive classical music festivals in the South-Eastern Europe. Enjoying the position of a cultural event of special importance for the City of Belgrade, BEMUS has been a member of the European Festivals Association (EFA) since 2002.

History 
Although special attention has always been devoted to the promotion of local artists and their creativity, BEMUS has established its reputation mostly presenting the most attractive international programmes. Thanks to BEMUS, only over the last several years, Belgrade has hosted some of the most prominent ensembles and soloists of our time – Concertgebouw Orchestra, Gothenburg Symphony Orchestra, Budapest Festival Orchestra, Frankfurt Radio Symphony Orchestra, Munich Philharmonic, Orchestra RAI Torino, New York Philharmonic... as well as Gidon Kremer & Kremerata Baltica, Camerata Salzburg, Il Giardino Armonico, Les Percussions de Strasbourg, Peking Opera, Kronos Quartet, Béjart Ballet, Eifman Ballet... Martha Argerich, Zubin Mehta, Nelson Freire, Melvin Tan, Stephen Kovacevich, Hakan Hårdenberger, Jean-Yves Thibaudet, Mischa Maisky, Elsabeth Leonskaya, Maxim Vengerov, Julian Rachlin, Renaud Capuçon, Leonidas Kavakos...
Apart from the well established performers, BEMUS opens its venues to young musicians who are ready to launch their professional careers. Equal attention is committed to exclusive contemporary music and stage productions (opera, ballet and multimedia projects) which often reach for alternative artistic achievements. Many of these projects are produced or co-produced by BEMUS.
Executive producer of the BEMUS Festival is JUGOKONCERT, Belgrade Concert Agency.

References

External links
 Bemus official website
 Closing of 40th BEMUS (In Serbian)
 Made in Silence, Concert Lute and Electric Guitar,Bemus - Beograd 2007, Video on YouTube
Music festivals established in 1969

Music festivals in Serbia
Music in Belgrade
Classical music festivals in Serbia
1969 establishments in Yugoslavia
Music festivals in Yugoslavia